The following is a list of football stadiums in Brazil, ordered by capacity. Currently stadiums with a capacity of 5,000 or more are included.

Current stadiums

References

Brazil
Stadiums
 
Football stadiums